Michetta  (little crumb; only used in Northern Italy) or Rosetta  (little rose, used in the rest of the country) is an Italian white bread, recognizable by its bulged shape.

History
Michetta is a variation of the Austrian Kaisersemmel brought to Milan in the 19th century during the Austrian rule. Functionaries of the Austrian empire introduced a number of food products, including the Kaisersemmel, a type of bread with segments resembling a small rose.

However, due to the higher humidity, the michetta produced in Milan is made with a modified recipe, and only lasts one day.

The michetta rolls are highly leavened, more so than the Viennese Kaisersemmel, so the interior is very nearly hollow, producing a very light roll with hard crust, but they do not keep very well, and are best eaten freshly baked.

The new type of bread was called michetta, from the Lombard version of Kaisersemmel, micca, a term originally meaning "crumb."

References

External links

Page about michetta and other Lombardy breads 

Cuisine of Lombardy
Italian breads
Yeast breads